Anastasiia Illarionova (born 28 March 1999) is a Russian handball player for HC Astrakhanochka and the Russian national handball team.

She represented Russia at the 2019 World Women's Handball Championship.

References

External links

Russian female handball players
1999 births
Living people
People from Istrinsky District
Sportspeople from Moscow Oblast